Christophe de Dinechin is a French computer scientist, with contributions in video games, programming languages and operating systems.

Programming languages 
Dinechin contributed to C++, notably a high-performance exception handling implementation that became a de facto standard in the industry. de Dinechin was one of the proponents of a portable C++ ABI, initially developed for Itanium, but now widely used across platforms.

XL programming language 
Dinechin is the designer of the XL programming language and associated concept programming methodology. "XL" is named for "eXtensible Language".

XL features programmer-reconfigurable syntax and semantics. Compiler plug-ins can be used to add new features to the language. A base set of plug-ins implements a relatively standard imperative language. Programmers can write their own plug-ins to implement application-specific notations, such as symbolic differentiation, which can then be used as readily as built-in language features.

Similar works
There are projects that exploit similar ideas to create code with higher level of abstraction. Among them are:
 Intentional programming
 Language-oriented programming
 Literate programming
 Model-driven architecture

Video games 
As initial developer of Alpha Waves, a "groundbreaking" Atari ST game (probably the first 3D platform game), de Dinechin heavily influenced Frederick Raynal, the main developer of Alone in the Dark. de Dinechin also wrote a few viral games for HP-48 calculators, and was the first person to take advantage of hardware-scrolling on these machines.

Operating systems design 
In the early 2000s, he worked as a software architect for HP-UX, and was the initial designer of HP's virtualisation platform for Itanium servers, HP Integrity Virtual Machines. He was awarded 10 US patents for this work.

Other work 
Christophe de Dinechin did the initial port of Emacs to the Aqua user interface. He wrote a variety of open-source drivers for the HP DE200C Digital Entertainment Center, turning it from a web-connected CD Player into a true digital video recorder.

Christophe de Dinechin is currently CEO of Taodyne, a company that develops a 3D animation tool, using his XL programming language to describe dynamic documents.

References 

Living people
French computer scientists
French video game designers
Programming language researchers
Kernel programmers
Free software programmers
Year of birth missing (living people)